Sartori is an Italian surname. Notable people with the surname include:

Agostinho José Sartori (1929–2012), Roman Catholic bishop
Alcindo Sartori (born 1967), retired Brazilian football player
Alessandro Sartori artistic director of Ermenegildo Zegna group
Alessio Sartori (born 1976), Italian competition rower and Olympic champion
Amalia Sartori (born 1947), Italian politician
Amleto Sartori (1915 - 1962), Italian sculptor and mask-maker.
Athanase Sartori (born 1852, date of death unknown), French sports shooter
Carlo Sartori (born 1948), British and Italian professional footballer
Claudio Sartori (1913–1994), Italian musicologist
Francesco Sartori (born 1957), Italian composer and musician
Gianni Sartori (born 1946), retired Italian track cyclist 
Giovanni Sartori (1924–2017), Italian political scientist
Giovanni Sartori (footballer) (born 1957), Italian professional football official and a former player
Ian Sartori (born 1958), former Australian rules footballer
Igor Sartori (born 1993), Brazilian born Striker
José Ivo Sartori (born 1948), Brazilian politician
Joseph Francis Sartori (1858–1946), American banker and civic leader
Juan Sartori (born 1981), Uruguayan businessman and entrepreneur
Nicola Sartori (born 1976), Italian rower
Penny Sartori (PhD), British medical researcher 
Peter Sartori (born 1957), British & Italian businessman
Peter Sartori (born 1964), Australian rules football player
Ray Sartori (1885–1961), Australian rules footballer 
Rodrigo Augusto Sartori Costa (born 1983), Brazilian football player

Surnames of South Tyrolean origin
Occupational surnames
Italian-language surnames